Alcalde Díaz  is a town and corregimiento in Panamá District, Panamá Province, Panama with a population of 41,292 . It was created by Law 42 of July 10, 2009.

References

Populated places in Panamá Province
Corregimientos of Panamá Province
Panamá District